The Elisha Seymour Jr. House is a historic house at 410-412 Park Road in West Hartford, Connecticut.  Built about 1770, it is one of the town's few surviving pre-independence brick buildings.  it was listed on the National Register of Historic Places in 1986.

Description and history
The Elisha Seymour Jr. House stands west of the center of West Hartford, on the north side of Park Road between Trout Brook Drive and Jessamine Street.  It is a -story painted brick building, with a side gable roof and interior end chimneys.  Its main facade is three bays wide, with the main entrance in the center, sheltered by an enclosed wood frame vestibule, finished with a gable roof and clapboards.  A single-story gabled ell extends to the right, in front of which is a hip-roofed open porch supported by square columns.

The house is estimated to have been built about 1770.  Its first documented owner was Elisha Seymour Jr., a shoemaker.  It is a modest example of brick residential architecture of the period, but is locally significant because it is one of the few pre-independence brick buildings in West Hartford.

See also
National Register of Historic Places listings in West Hartford, Connecticut

References

Houses on the National Register of Historic Places in Connecticut
National Register of Historic Places in West Hartford, Connecticut
Colonial architecture in the United States
Houses completed in 1770
Houses in Hartford County, Connecticut